The South Atlantic Quarterly is an American little magazine founded by John Spencer Bassett, a history professor at Trinity College, in 1901. The magazine published articles about on southern history and, following the example of the Sewanee Review, also tackled topics dealing with the issue of race in the South.

References

Further reading 
 
 
 

Little magazines
Literary magazines published in the United States
Quarterly magazines published in the United States
Magazines established in 1901
Duke University Press academic journals